The Bongs Again is a bilingual Indian Bengali/English film, directed by Anjan Dutt and produced by Overseas Films Limited. It was released on 13 January 2017.

Synopsis 
10 years after The Bong Connection, The Bongs Again is a journey of two young women. Sara, in her 20s, comes to Kolkata from the UK to look for her biological mother. Oli, also in her 20s, goes to London from Kolkata in search of her father who had left her and the family.

The story takes us through their journeys, the connections they make, and the pursuit of finding their blood relations. The Bongs Again is fun-filled but with insights which change the way we perceive life. The film depicts today's cosmo Calcuttans and NRI Bengalis, their lifestyle, thinking, and approach towards life.

Cast 
 Deepak Anand as Deepak (father)
 Aditi Bajpai as Aitree, the friend
 Gaurav Chakrabarty as Anindya
 Subhra Sourav Das
 Anjan Dutt
 Hassan Khan
 Bradley Wj Miller as gang leader
 Parno Mittra as Oli
 Neha Panda as Sara
 Jisshu Sengupta as Jisshu
 'mJo Wheatley as Martha

Soundtrack 
The songs are written by Rabindranath Tagore, and Neel Dutt. The music composer is Neel Dutt.

References

External links
 

Bengali-language Indian films
2010s Bengali-language films
2017 films
Films directed by Anjan Dutt
Indian drama films